Mertert railway station is a railway station serving Mertert, in eastern Luxembourg.  It is operated by Chemins de Fer Luxembourgeois, the state-owned railway company.

The station is situated on Line 30, which connects Luxembourg City to the east of the country and Trier.

External links
 Official CFL page on Mertert station
 Rail.lu page on Mertert station

Railway
Railway stations in Luxembourg
Railway stations on CFL Line 30